Nadia Hussain Khan (born 11 January 1979) is a Pakistani television actress, host, supermodel, entrepreneur and fashion designer. She's recognized as one of Pakistan's first supermodels.

Career 
Hussain was born in UK. At the age of four she came to Karachi, Pakistan. Hussain started her career in modelling in 2000, just after she had completed her A-levels. Hussain, just 20 at the time, appeared in a modelling shoot for a Winter Collection of Lakhani Silk Mills.  She was the only Pakistani model to have been chosen by Rizwan Beyg for the Sarajevo Fashion Week. As an actress she has worked in various dramas. She is a practicing dentist, also owns a salon and has her own lawn collection and footwear line called Fetish. She is the niece of the renowned pakistani singer Tina Sani. She did her first shoot for Herald magazine with Deepak Perwani and Tapu Javeri as fashion designer and photographer.

Personal life 
Hussain got married at the age of 24 to investment banker Atif Khan in 2003. She is the mother of four children.

Television 
 Ishq Junoon Deewangi (Hum TV)
 Ladies Park (Geo Entertainment)
 Manay Na Ye Dil (Hum TV) as Rubab
 Noor Bano (Hum TV) as Sara
 Omar Dadi aur Gharwalay (ARY Digital)
 Sitamgar (Hum TV) as Zeba
 Choti Si Kahani (PTV Home) as Mishal
 Shert (Urdu 1) as Afroze
 Mithu Aur Aapa (Hum TV)
 Kitni Girhain Baaki Hain (Hum TV)
 Ittehad Ramzan
 Tera Yahan Koi Nahin
Raja Ki Raji
 Thays as Shahista 
 Jalan (ARY Digital) as Kinza
 Chupke Chupke (Hum TV) as Amma Chuumantar
 Yun Tu Hai Pyar Bohut (Hum TV)
 Pehchaan (Hum TV) as Shaheena

References 

Living people
Pakistani female models
Pakistani television actresses
Pakistani television hosts
Pakistani fashion designers
Pakistani dentists
Beaconhouse School System alumni
Actresses from Karachi
21st-century Pakistani actresses
Pakistani women television presenters
1979 births
Pakistani women fashion designers